José Triana may refer to:

 José Triana (athlete) (born 1935), Cuban sprinter
 José Triana (poet) (1931–2018), Cuban poet and playwright
 José Jerónimo Triana (1828–1890), Colombian botanist, explorer, and physician